Cyclelive Plus–Zannata was a Belgian professional cycling team, which competed in elite road bicycle racing events such as the UCI Women's Road World Cup.

References

Cycling teams based in Belgium
UCI Women's Teams
Cycling teams established in 2013
Cycling teams disestablished in 2013